Gerben 'Germ' Hofma  (19 April 1925 – 14 October 2018) was a Dutch football player in the 1940s and 1950s. He most notably played for Heerenveen.

References

External links

1925 births
2018 deaths
Dutch footballers
Netherlands international footballers
SC Heerenveen players
Eredivisie players
People from Sittard

Association football forwards
Footballers from Limburg (Netherlands)